Jascha Brodsky (June 6, 1907 – March 3, 1997) was a Russian-American violinist and teacher.

Born in Kharkiv, in the Kharkov Governorate of the Russian Empire (in present-day Ukraine), he began his violin studies with his violinist father at the age of six. He later studied at the conservatory in Tbilisi, Georgia, and by 1926, was performing successfully all over the Soviet Union. That same year, he went to Paris to study with Lucien Capet. There he also played for Sergei Prokofiev (Violin Concerto No. 1) and performed with pianist Vladimir Horowitz and violinists Nathan Milstein and Mischa Elman.

Soon thereafter, he moved again, to Belgium to study with the legendary Eugène Ysaÿe.

In 1930 he moved to America to study with Efrem Zimbalist at the Curtis Institute of Music. Alongside his classmates Orlando Cole, Max Aronoff, and Benjamin Sharlip, Brodsky formed in 1932 an ensemble which would later be called the Curtis String Quartet and served as the first violinist of the quartet until the group disbanded in 1981 after the death of the quartet's violist, Max Aronoff.

Brodsky joined the faculty at the Curtis Institute in 1932 and remained there until just after World War II when, with the rest of the Curtis String Quartet, he resigned over disagreements with certain of the school's policies to help found the New School of Music. After re-joining the faculty in the early 1950s, he remained for nearly fifty years, later being appointed to the Efrem Zimbalist Chair of Violin Studies, which position he held until his death in 1997. A respected pedagogue, his students are dispersed widely among the finest musical institutions in the world. Numbered among his students are Hilary Hahn, Joseph de Pasquale, Leila Josefowicz, Choong-Jin Chang, Juliette Kang, Judith Ingolfsson, Herbert Greenberg, Joey Corpus, Chin Kim, and Shira Katsman.

With Aronoff, Brodsky founded the New School of Music in Philadelphia when they decided that there was a present need to train musicians specifically for a career in chamber music or in orchestra. In 1986, The New School of Music was merged into Temple University's Boyer College of Music and Dance, where Brodsky was appointed Professor Emeritus. He taught at the school until his retirement in 1996.

He died in Ocala, Florida in
1997.

In a 2019 Philadelphia Inquirer investigation, Lara St. John and four other unnamed women accused Brodsky of sexually assaulting them when they were his students. They alleged that after reporting his advances to the Curtis administration, they were mocked and their allegations were ignored. Curtis had hired law firm Morgan Lewis in 2013 to investigate St. John's allegations, but the firm interviewed only two people and concluded no further investigation was needed. In November 2019, Curtis hired the firm Cozen O'Connor to conduct another independent investigation into St. John's accusations, as well as other potential incidents of sexual assault and abuse, promising to make the full report available to the public. On September 22, 2020, Curtis released the report, in which the attorneys who prepared it—Gina Maisto Smith and Leslie Gomez, former child abuse and sex crimes prosecutors—concluded that Brodsky had in fact sexually abused and raped St. John during the 1985–86 school year, during which time she was 14 and 15 years old. Smith and Gomez further concluded that Curtis had fallen "short in its institutional response" at several points when St. John informed the school of what Brodsky had done. The school issued an apology, and committed to new policies and actions to prevent future sexual abuse and make reporting easier for survivors.

References

1907 births
1997 deaths
Musicians from Kharkiv
People from Kharkov Governorate
Ukrainian Jews
Soviet emigrants to the United States
American male violinists
Ukrainian violinists
Violin pedagogues
Tbilisi State Conservatoire alumni
Temple University faculty
Curtis Institute of Music alumni
Curtis Institute of Music faculty
20th-century classical violinists
Jewish classical violinists
20th-century American male musicians
Male classical violinists
20th-century American violinists